Events from the year 1992 in the United Kingdom. This year was the Ruby Jubilee of Queen Elizabeth II.

This year is notable for a fourth-term general election victory for the Conservative Party; "Black Wednesday" (16 September), the suspension of the UK's membership of the European Exchange Rate Mechanism; and an annus horribilis for the Royal Family.

Incumbents
Monarch – Elizabeth II 
Prime Minister –  John Major (Conservative)
Parliament
 50th (until 16 March)
 51st (starting 27 April)

Events

January
 January – Statistics show that economic growth returned during the final quarter of 1991 after five successive quarters of contraction.
 9 January
 Liberal Democrat leader Paddy Ashdown proposes a £3billion package which would create 400,000 jobs in 12 months.
 Alison Halford, the UK's most senior policewoman, is suspended from duty for a second time following a police authority meeting.
 10 January – The first full week of 1992 sees some 4,000 jobs lost across the UK, as the nation's recession continues. Almost 20% of those job cuts have been by GEC, the UK's leading telecommunications manufacturer, where 750 redundancies are announced today.
 14 January – The Bank of Credit and Commerce International goes into liquidation.
 17 January
 Eight people are killed in the Teebane bombing.
 The first MORI poll of 1992 shows the Conservatives three points ahead of Labour on 42%, while the Liberal Democrats have their best showing yet with 16% of the vote.
 29 January – The Department of Health reveals that AIDS cases among heterosexuals increased by 50% between 1990 and 1991.
 30 January – John Major agrees a weapons control deal with new Russian premier Boris Yeltsin at 10 Downing Street.

February
 2 February – Neil Kinnock, Labour leader, denies reports that he had a "Kremlin connection" during the 1980s.
 6 February – The Queen commemorates her Ruby Jubilee, the first British monarch to do so since her great-great-grandmother Queen Victoria in 1877.
 7 February – Signing of the Maastricht Treaty.
 8–23 February – Great Britain and Northern Ireland compete at the Winter Olympics in Albertville, France, but do not win any medals.
 9 February – Prime Minister John Major speaks of his hopes that the recession will soon be over as the economy is now showing signs of recovery.
 15 February – Neil Kinnock, Labour Party leader, speaks of his belief that the Conservative government's failure to halt the current recession will win his party the forthcoming general election.
 18 February – David Stevens, head of community relations, blames the recession for the recent rise in crime across the UK – Most of all in deprived areas.
 20 February – Hopes of an end to the recession are dashed by government figures which reveal that GDP fell by 0.3% in the final quarter of 1991.
 23 February – The London Business School predicts an economic growth rate of 1.2% for this year, sparking hopes that the recession is nearing its end.

March
 March
 The Saatchi Gallery in London stages the Young British Artists exhibition, featuring Damien Hirst's "shark", The Physical Impossibility of Death in the Mind of Someone Living.
 Toyota launches the Carina E large family hatchback, saloon and estate range which will initially be imported from Japan before production of European market models commences later this year at the new Burnaston plant near Derby.
 6 March – Parliament passes the Further and Higher Education Act, allowing polytechnics to become new universities. Legislation passed under the Act on 4 June allows them to award degrees of their own, and they thus reopen in September for the new academic year with the status of universities. In addition, sixth form colleges are to become independent of local education authority control.
 11 March
 John Major announces a general election for 9 April.
 Shadow Chancellor John Smith condemns the recent Budget as a "missed opportunity" by the Conservatives, saying that they did "nothing" for jobs, training, skills, construction or economic recovery.
 13 March – The first ecumenical church in Britain, the Christ the Cornerstone Church in Milton Keynes is opened.
 17 March – Shadow Chancellor John Smith announces that there will be no tax reductions this year if Labour win the election.
 19 March
 Buckingham Palace announces that Duke and Duchess of York are to separate after six years of marriage.
 Unemployment has reached 2,647,300 – 9.4% of the British workforce, the highest level since late 1987.
 24 March
 Election campaigning becomes dominated by the "War of Jennifer's Ear".
 The editors of Punch, the UK's oldest satirical magazine, announce that it will be discontinued due to massive losses. In circulation since 1841, it publishes its last issue on 8 April.
 25 March – Aldershot F.C., bottom of the Football League Fourth Division, are declared bankrupt and become the first Football League club in 30 years to resign from the league.
 26 March – Television entertainer Roy Castle (59), who currently presents Record Breakers, announces that he is suffering from lung cancer.
 29 March – John Spencer, 8th Earl Spencer and father of Princess Diana, dies suddenly from pneumonia at the age of 68.

April
 April – Statistics show that the first quarter of this year saw the economy grow for the second quarter running, the sequel to five successive quarters of detraction, though the growth is still too narrow for the recession to be declared over.
 1 April – The latest opinion polls show a narrow lead for Labour, which would force a hung parliament in the election next week.
 4 April – Party Politics becomes the tallest horse to win the Grand National.
 5 April – At his pre-election speech, Neil Kinnock promises a strong economic recovery if he leads the Labour party to election victory on Thursday.
 6 April – Women's Royal Army Corps disbanded, its members being fully absorbed into the regular British Army.
 7 April – The final MORI poll before the general election shows Labour one point ahead of the Conservatives on 39%, while the Liberal Democrats continue to enjoy a surge in popularity with 20% of the vote. Most opinion polls show a similar situation, hinting at either a narrow Labour majority or a hung parliament.
 9 April – General election: the Conservative Party are re-elected for a fourth successive term, in their first election under John Major's leadership. Their majority is reduced to 21 seats but they have attracted more than 14,000,000 votes – the highest number of votes ever attracted in a general election. Notable retirements from parliament at this election include former prime minister Margaret Thatcher and former Labour leader Michael Foot.
 10 April
 Three people are killed in the Baltic Exchange bombing.
 With the government's victory in the election confirmed, John Major assures the public that he will lead the country out of recession that has blighted it for nearly two years.
 11 April – Publication of The Sun newspaper's iconic front-page headline 'It's The Sun Wot Won It', as the tabloid newspaper claims it won the general election for the Conservatives with its anti-Kinnock front-page headline on election day.
 12 April – Manchester United win the Football League Cup for the first time with a 1–0 win over Nottingham Forest in the Wembley final. Brian McClair scores the only goal of the game.
 13 April
 Neil Kinnock resigns as leader of the Labour Party following the defeat of his party in the General Election. he had led the party for eight-and-a-half years since October 1983, and is the longest serving opposition leader in British political history.
 The Princess Royal announces her divorce from Capt Mark Phillips after 19 years of marriage, having separated in 1989.
 16 April – Unemployment has now risen 23 months in succession, but the March rise in unemployment is the smallest monthly rise so far.
 17–20 April – Lost Gardens of Heligan in Cornwall first opened to the public.
 27 April – Betty Boothroyd, 62-year-old Labour MP for West Bromwich West in the West Midlands, is elected as Speaker of the House of Commons, the first woman to hold the position.

May
 5 May – UEFA awards the 1996 European Football Championships to England, who will be hosting a major tournament for the first time since the 1966 World Cup. 
 6 May – John Major promises British voters improved services and more money to spend.
 9 May – Liverpool win the FA Cup for the fifth time, beating Sunderland 2–0 in the Wembley final. Ian Rush and Michael Thomas score Liverpool's goals.
 12–15 May – Rioting breaks out on the Wood End housing estate in Coventry, and spreads to the Willenhall district. 
 12 May – Plans are unveiled for a fifth terminal at Heathrow Airport, which is now the busiest airport in the world.
 17 May – Nigel Mansell gains the 26th Grand Prix win of his racing career at Imola, San Marino. He is now the most successful British driver in Grand Prix races, and the fourth worldwide.
 22 May – Twenty-two "Maastricht Rebels" vote against the government on the second reading of the European Communities (Amendment) Bill.
 22–29 May – A week-long rave festival in Castlemorton Common in the Malvern Hills is held, causing media outrage due to drug-use and noise complaints from neighbours.

June
 June – Cones Hotline introduced enabling members of the public to complain about traffic cones being deployed on a road for no apparent reason.
 7 June – A controversial new biography of the Princess of Wales, Diana: Her True Story, written by Andrew Morton, is published, revealing that she has made five suicide attempts following her discovery that the Prince of Wales (now Charles III) had resumed an affair with his previous girlfriend Mrs Parker Bowles (now Camilla, Queen Consort) shortly after Prince William's birth in 1982.
 17 June
 Almost 2.7 million people are now out of work as unemployment continues to rise.
 The England national football team are eliminated from the European Championships in Sweden after losing 2–1 to the host nation in their final group game.
 24 June – Ravenscraig steelworks, the largest hot strip steel mill in Western Europe, closes, ending steelmaking in Scotland.
 25 June – GDP is reported to have fallen by 0.5% in the first quarter of this year as the recession continues.
 30 June – Margaret Thatcher enters the House of Lords as Baroness Thatcher.

July
 July – Statistics show that the economy contracted during the second quarter of this year.
 2 July – The IRA admits to murdering three men whose bodies were found by the army at various locations around Armagh last night. The men are believed to have been informers employed by MI5.
 9 July – Riots break out in Ordsall, Greater Manchester.
 10 July – Another sign of economic recovery is shown as inflation falls from 4.3% to 3.9%.
 15 July – Killing of Rachel Nickell: a 23-year-old mother is stabbed to death in broad daylight while out walking her dog on Wimbledon Common; her murderer, Robert Napper, will not be convicted until 2008.
 16 July – Riots break out in Hartcliffe, Bristol, following the deaths of two local men who died when the stolen police motorcycle they were riding was hit by a police car.
 17 July
 John Smith is elected leader of the Labour Party.
 Official opening of Manchester Metrolink, the first new-generation light rail system with street running in the British Isles.
 21 July – British Airways announces a takeover of USAir.
 22 July – Riots break out in Blackburn, Burnley and Huddersfield.
 23 July – Three months after losing the general election, Labour finish four points ahead of the Conservatives in a MORI poll, with 43% of the vote.
 25 July–9 August – Great Britain and Northern Ireland compete at the Olympics in Barcelona and win 5 gold, 3 silver and 12 bronze medals.
 26 July – Riots break out in the Peckham and Southwark districts of South London.
 27 July – Alan Shearer becomes England's most expensive footballer in a £3.6 million transfer from Southampton to Blackburn Rovers. Shearer, who turns 22 next month, was a member of England's Euro 92 national squad, having scored on his debut in a friendly international against France in February this year.

August
 August – Graham Norton debuts at the Edinburgh Festival Fringe.
 6 August – Lord Hope, the Lord President of the Court of Session, Scotland's most senior judge, permits the televising of appeals in both criminal and civil cases, the first time that cameras have been allowed into courts in the United Kingdom.
 10 August – Nissan commences production of its British built Micra supermini, which goes on sale in Britain and the rest of Europe at the end of this year.
 15 August – The new FA Premier League commences.
 16 August – English driver Nigel Mansell comes in second in the Hungarian Grand Prix and wins the 1992 Formula One season with five races still remaining. Mansell becomes the first Briton to win the title since James Hunt in the 1976 Formula One season.
 17 August – Five months after the demise of Aldershot FC, Maidstone United resign from the Football League due to large debts and being unable to fulfill their fixtures for the new Division Three season.
 20 August – Intimate photographs of Sarah, Duchess of York and a Texan businessman, John Bryan, are published in the Daily Mirror.

September
 5 September – Italian supercar manufacturer Ferrari announces that its Formula One division will be designing and manufacturing cars in the UK.
 7 September – Britain's first national commercial radio station, Classic FM, launches, broadcasting classical music.
 13 September – Nigel Mansell announces his retirement from Formula One racing.
 16 September – "Black Wednesday" sees the government suspending the UK's membership of the European Exchange Rate Mechanism following a wave of speculation against the Pound.
 17 September – There is more bad news for the economy as unemployment is at a five-year high of 2,845,508, and experts warn that it will soon hit 3,000,000 for the first time since early 1987.
 18 September – The latest MORI poll shows the Labour Party four points ahead of the Conservatives at 43%, following the events of Black Wednesday two days earlier.
 24 September – David Mellor resigns as Heritage Minister amid tabloid press speculation that he had been conducting an adulterous affair with actress Antonia de Sancha.
 30 September – The Royal Mint introduces a new 10-pence coin which is lighter and smaller than the previous coin.

October
 October
 First Cochrane Centre opens.
 Statistics show a return to economic growth for the third quarter of this year.
 9 October – Two suspected IRA bombs explode in London, but there are no injuries.
 13 October – The government announces the closure of a third of Britain's deep coal mines, with the loss of 31,000 jobs.
 14 October – The England football team begins its qualification campaign for the 1994 FIFA World Cup with a 1–1 draw against Norway at Wembley Stadium.
 15 October – The value of the pound sterling is reported to have dipped further as the recession deepens.
 16 October – The government attempts to tackle the recession by cutting the base interest rate to 8% – the lowest since June 1988.
 19 October – John Major announces that only ten deep coal mines will be closed.
 21 October – Commodore UK release the new Amiga 1200 computer.
 25 October – Around 100,000 people protest in London against the government's pit closure plans.
 26 October – British Steel Corporation announces a 20% production cut as a result in falling demand from its worldwide customer base.
 30 October – IRA terrorists force a taxi driver to drive to Downing Street at gunpoint and once there they detonate a bomb, but there are no injuries.

November
 11 November – The Church of England votes to allow women to become priests.
 12 November
 British Telecom reports a £1.03 billion profit for the half year ending 30 September – a fall of 36.2% on the previous half year figure, as a result of the thousands of redundancies it has made this year due to the recession.
 Unemployment has continued to climb and is now approaching 2,900,000. It has risen every month since June 1990, when it was below 1,700,000. The current level has not been seen since mid-1987.
 16 November – The Hoxne Hoard is discovered by metal detectorist Eric Lawes in Suffolk.
 19 November – The High Court rules that doctors can disconnect feeding tubes from Tony Bland, a young man who has been in a coma since the Hillsborough disaster in 1989. Bland, of Liverpool, suffered massive brain damage in the disaster and doctors treating him say that there is no reasonable possibility that he could recover consciousness and in his current condition would be unlikely to survive more than five years.
 20 November – Part of Windsor Castle is gutted in a fire, causing millions of pounds worth of damage.
 23 November – Ford unveils the new Mondeo, which succeeds the long-running Sierra and goes on sale in March 1993. 
 24 November – The Queen describes this year as an Annus Horribilis (horrible year) due to various scandals damaging the image of the Royal Family, as well as the Windsor Castle fire.
 26 November
 The Queen is to be taxed from next year, marking the end of almost 60 tax-free years for the British monarchy.
 Pepper v Hart, a landmark case, is decided in the House of Lords on the use of legislative history in statutory interpretation, establishing the principle that when primary legislation is ambiguous then, under certain circumstances, the courts may refer to statements made during its passage through parliament in an attempt to interpret its intended meaning, an action previously regarded as a breach of parliamentary privilege.
 29 November – Ethnic minorities now account for more than 3,000,000 (over 5%) of the British population.

December
 3 December – Two bombings take place in Manchester.
 9 December – The separation of the Prince and Princess of Wales (Charles and Diana) is announced following months of speculation about their marriage, but there are no plans for a divorce and John Major announces that Diana could still become Queen.
 11 December – The last MORI poll of 1992 shows Labour thirteen points ahead of the Conservatives on 47%, just three months after several polls had shown a Conservative lead. Black Wednesday, which has damaged much of the government's reputation for monetary excellence, is largely blamed for the fall in Conservative support.
 12 December – The marriage of Anne, Princess Royal, and Timothy Laurence takes place.
 16 December
 Four people are injured by IRA bombs in Oxford Street, London.
 Japanese carmaker Toyota opens a factory at Burnaston, near Derby, which produces the Carina family saloon.
17 December
 The national unemployment level has risen to more than 2.9 million, with the unemployment rate in the south-east of England now above 10% for the first time.
 Jonathan Zito is stabbed to death by Christopher Clunis, a partially treated schizophrenic patient.
 23 December – The Queen's Royal Christmas Message is leaked in The Sun newspaper, 48 hours ahead of its traditional Christmas Day broadcast on television.
 31 December
 Thames Television, TVS, TSW and TV-am broadcast for the last time. The ORACLE teletext service is discontinued on ITV and Channel 4 to be replaced by a new service operated by the Teletext Ltd. consortium, having been launched on ITV in 1978 and used by Channel 4 since its inception in 1982.
 The economy has grown in the final quarter of this year – the second successive quarter of economic growth – but the recovery is still too weak for the end of the recession to be declared.

Undated
 Inflation has fallen to a six-year low to 3.7%.
 Stella Rimington is appointed as the first female Director General of MI5.
 Barbara Mills is appointed as the first female Director of Public Prosecutions (England and Wales).
 Palawan Press is founded in London.
 Most leading retailers, including WH Smith, withdraw vinyl records from stock due to a sharp decline in sales brought on by the rising popularity of compact discs and audio cassettes.

Publications
 Douglas Adams' novel Mostly Harmless.
 Iain Banks' novel The Crow Road.
 Louis de Bernières' novel The Troublesome Offspring of Cardinal Guzman.
 Alasdair Gray's novel Poor Things
 Nick Hornby's novel Fever Pitch.
 Ian McEwan's novel Black Dogs.
 Terry Pratchett's Discworld novels Small Gods and Lords and Ladies; and his Johnny Maxwell novel Only You Can Save Mankind.
 Adam Thorpe's novel Ulverton.
 Barry Unsworth's novel Sacred Hunger.

Births

January

 1 January
 Corey Barnes, footballer
 Andrai Jones, footballer
 Jack Wilshere, footballer
 3 January – Daniel McLay, New Zealand born racing cyclist
 4 January – Jamie Griffiths, footballer
 5 January
 Louis Almond, footballer
 Suki Waterhouse, model and actress
 8 January – Kenny McLean, footballer
 12 January – Georgia May Jagger, model
 14 January – Tom Eaves, footballer
 15 January – John Bostock, footballer
 16 January – Josh Dawkin, footballer
 22 January – Reece Connolly, footballer
 24 January – Becky Downie, gymnast
 30 January – Tom Ince, footballer
 31 January – James Hurst, footballer
 31 January – Amy Jackson, model and actress

February

 1 February
 Kamil Ahmet Çörekçi, footballer
 Lewis Horner, footballer
 2 February – Ben Cox, cricketer
 7 February – Jose Baxter, footballer
 8 February – Carl Jenkinson, footballer
 9 February – Josh Fuller, footballer
 11 February
 Blair Dunlop, actor and musician
 Georgia Groome, actress
 14 February – Freddie Highmore, actor
 17 February – Reiss Beckford, gymnast
 18 February – Rhys Owen Davies, actor
 20 February – Sam Mantom, footballer
 21 February
 Chris Brown, footballer
 Phil Jones, footballer
 27 February 
 Ryan Jack, footballer
 Jonjo Shelvey, footballer
 Callum Wilson, footballer

March

 2 March – Maisie Richardson-Sellers, actress
 4 March
 Kieran Duffie, footballer
 Daniel Lloyd, racing car driver
 5 March – Amber Anderson, actress 
 7 March – Bel Powley, actress
 10 March – Andy Hutchinson, footballer
 12 March – Chris Atkinson, footballer
 13 March
 George MacKay, actor
 Antoni Sarcevic, footballer
 Kaya Scodelario, actress and model
 15 March – Anna Shaffer, actress
 16 March
 Danny Ings, footballer
 Michael Perham, youngest person to sail the Atlantic Ocean single-handed
 17 March
 Eliza Hope Bennett, actress and singer
 John Boyega, British film actor
 22 March – Luke Freeman, footballer
 23 March – Lewis Burton, tennis player and model
 24 March – Billy Bodin, footballer
 25 March – Craig Lynch, footballer
 27 March – Mark Gillespie, footballer

April

 4 April – Lucy May Barker, stage and screen actress
 10 April – Daisy Ridley, actress
 11 April – Rod McDonald, footballer
 14 April – Shaun Jeffers, footballer
 15 April – Kayleden Brown, footballer
 19 April – Nick Pope, footballer
 20 April – Andy Halls, footballer
 21 April
George Burgess, English rugby league player
Tom Burgess, English rugby league player
Mark Cullen, footballer
 22 April – Thomas James Longley, actor
 24 April – Laura Trott, track and road cyclist
 26 April – Danielle Hope, actress and singer
 28 April – Abdulai Bell-Baggie, footballer

May

 1 May
James Hasson, Irish-Australian rugby league player
 5 May – Craig Clay, footballer
 8 May – Ana Mulvoy-Ten, actress
 9 May – Dan Burn, footballer
 14 May – Jerome Federico, footballer
 16 May
 John Marquis, footballer
 19 May
 Sam Smith, singer
 Eleanor Tomlinson, actress
 Heather Watson, tennis player
 24 May
 Aidan Chippendale, footballer
 Lewis Gregory, cricketer
 Ryan Leonard, footballer
 25 May – Callum McNish, footballer
 26 May – Nathan Koranteng, footballer
 28 May – Tom Carroll, footballer
 29 May – Gregg Sulkin, actor

June

 1 June
 Felix Drake, actor and bass guitar
 Lateef Elford-Alliyu, Nigeria-born footballer
 3 June – Chris Kendall, rugby league referee
 4 June 
 Carl Forster, rugby league player
 Brooke Vincent, actress
 5 June – Nathan Byrne, footballer
 9 June – Lucien Laviscount, actor and recording artist
 11 June – Jordanne Whiley, English tennis player
 12 June – Laura Jones, gymnast
 20 June – Curtis Main, footballer
 23 June – Harry Reid, actor
 28 June – Tom Fisher, footballer

July

 1 July
 Theo Cowan, actor
 Ben Greenhalgh, footballer
 Hannah Whelan, gymnast
 5 July – Max Brick, diver
 8 July
 Kelsey-Beth Crossley, actress
 Benjamin Grosvenor, classical pianist
 9 July – Douglas Booth, actor
 13 July – Bryan Parry, Welsh actor
 17 July – Adam Davies, Welsh footballer
 21 July – Jessica Barden, actress
 23 July – Danny Ings, footballer
 25 July – Peter Gregory, footballer
 27 July – Tom Bradshaw, footballer
 28 July – George Spencer-Churchill, Earl of Sunderland
 30 July – Kevin Grocott, footballer

August

 2 August – Greg Austin, actor
 10 August – Oliver Rowland, racing driver
 12 August – Cara Delevingne, model and actress
 13 August – Keanu Marsh-Brown, footballer
 17 August – Paige, professional wrestler
 18 August – Amy Willerton, model
 21 August – Brad Kavanagh, actor and singer-songwriter
 25 August – Angelica Mandy, actress
 30 August – Jessica Henwick, actress
 31 August – Holly Earl, actress

September
 2 September – Cameron Darkwah, footballer
 4 September – Zerkaa, youtuber
 7 September – Simon Minter, youtuber
 9 September – Cameron Crighton, actor
 12 September – Jordan Burrow, footballer
 16 September – Jake Roche, actor and singer
 17 September – William Buller, driver
 20 September – Will Addison, rugby union player
 21 September – Arlissa, Germany-born singer-songwriter 
 22 September – Philip Hindes, Germany-born cyclist
 23 September – Matthew Harriott, footballer
 28 September
 Kristian Cox, footballer
 Keir Gilchrist, actor
 30 September – Cyrus Christie, footballer

October
 7 October – Kane Ferdinand, footballer
 9 October – Kofi Lockhart-Adams, footballer
 10 October
 Gabrielle Aplin, singer and songwriter
 Ben Phillips, YouTuber 
 22 October
 21 Savage, British-born rapper based in the U.S.
 Carrie Hope Fletcher, actress
 26 October – Johnny Gorman, footballer
 29 October
 Jacqueline Jossa, actress
 Brad Singleton, rugby league player

November
 November – Maia Krall Fry, actress and director
 1 November – Alexander Davidson, rugby league player
 5 November – Cameron Lancaster, footballer
 6 November – Robert Aramayo, actor
 14 November – Nathan Fox, English footballer
 15 November – Tom Coulton, footballer
 20 November – Michael Doughty, footballer
 22 November – Lauren Bruton, female football striker
 28 November – Sophie Moulds, Welsh television host, model, and beauty queen
 29 November – Steph Fraser, pop-folk singer-songwriter
 30 November – Samson Lee, Welsh rugby union player

December
 2 December 
 Reece Lyne, rugby league player
 Michael Gothard, actor (b. 1939)
 3 December – Joseph McManners, actor
 6 December – Percy Herbert, actor (b. 1920)
 15 December – Jesse Lingard, footballer
 17 December – Thomas Law, actor
 18 December – Connor Goldson, footballer defender
 21 December
Dale Jennings, footballer striker
Isobel Pooley, high jumper
 24 December – Melissa Suffield, actress
 26 December – Jade Thirlwall, recording artist, member of Little Mix
 30 December – Lacey Banghard, model

Deaths

 2 January – Joyce Butler, Labour Co-operative member of parliament (born 1910)
 9 January – Bill Naughton, playwright (born 1910)
 11 January – W. G. Hoskins, historian (born 1908)
 23 January – Freddie Bartholomew, actor (born 1924)
 4 February – Alan Davies, footballer (born 1961)
 16 February – Angela Carter, novelist and journalist (born 1940)
 17 February – John Fieldhouse, Baron Fieldhouse, First Sea Lord (born 1928)
 1 March – Howard Payne, hammer thrower (born 1931)
 2 March – Jackie Mudie, footballer (born 1930)
 3 March – G. L. S. Shackle, economist (born 1903)
 14 March – Elfrida Vipont, children's author (born 1902)
 18 March – Jack Kelsey, footballer (born 1929)
 9 April – Sir Peter Hayman, diplomat and paedophile (born 1914)
 10 April – Peter D. Mitchell, biochemist (born 1920)
 19 April – Frankie Howerd, comedian and actor (born 1917)
 20 April – Benny Hill, comedian and actor (born 1924)
 4 May – Gregor Mackenzie, Labour politician (born 1927)
 13 May – F. E. McWilliam, sculptor (born 1909)
 18 May – Eleanor Mears, medical practitioner and campaigner (born 1917)
 22 May – Elizabeth David, cookery writer (born 1913)
 24 May
 Francis Thomas Bacon, chemical engineer (born 1904)
 Joan Sanderson, actress (born 1912)
 27 May – Peter Jenkins, journalist (born 1934)
 1 June – Eve Gardiner, beautician and remedial make-up artist (born 1913)
 3 June – Robert Morley, character actor (born 1908)
 6 June – Richard Eurich, painter (born 1903)
 20 June – Sir Charles Groves, conductor (born 1915)
 25 June – James Stirling, architect (born 1926)
 29 June – Elie Kedourie, historian (born 1926, Iraq)
 10 July – Albert Pierrepoint, hangman (born 1905)
 12 July 
Ted Fenton, footballer and manager (born 1914)
Sir Basil Smallpeice, businessman (b. 1906)
 22 July – Alexander McKee, journalist, military historian and diver, discoverer of the Mary Rose (born 1918)
 23 July – Rosemary Sutcliff, children's historical novelist (born 1920)
 26 July – Richard Martin Bingham, Member of Parliament and judge (born 1915)
 31 July – Leonard Cheshire, RAF pilot (born 1917)
 1 August – Leslie Fox, mathematician (born 1918)
 9 August – Patrick Devlin, Baron Devlin, judge (born 1905)
 23 August – Donald Stewart, Scottish National Party Member of Parliament (born 1920)
 29 August – Mary Norton, author (born 1903)
 5 September – Christopher Trace, actor and television presenter (born 1933)
 19 September – Geraint Evans, baritone (born 1922)
 28 September – William Douglas-Home, tank officer, writer and dramatist, and brother of former prime minister Alec Douglas-Home (born 1912)
 3 October – Ken Wilmshurst, triple jumper (born 1931)
 6 October – Denholm Elliott, actor (born 1922)
 15 October – Oliver Franks, Baron Franks, public figure (born 1905)
 18 October – Gerald Ellison, former Bishop of London (born 1910)
 19 October – Magnus Pyke, scientist (born 1908)
 29 October – Kenneth MacMillan, ballet dancer and choreographer (born 1929)
 25 November – Sir Hugh Wontner, hotelier and Lord Mayor of London (born 1908)
 26 November – John Sharp, actor (born 1920)
 10 December – Dan Maskell, tennis coach and commentator (born 1908)
 19 December – H. L. A. Hart, legal philosopher (born 1907)
 22 December – Ted Willis, Baron Willis, television dramatist (born 1914)
 25 December
 Ted Croker, former Secretary of The Football Association (born 1924)
 Monica Dickens, author and great-granddaughter of Charles Dickens (born 1915)
 26 December – Edmund Davies, Baron Edmund-Davies, judge (born 1906)
 28 December – Cardew Robinson, comic actor (born 1917)

See also
 1992 in British music
 1992 in British television
 List of British films of 1992

References

 
Years of the 20th century in the United Kingdom
United Kingdom